Mahidol Wittayanusorn School (MWIT), also known colloquially as Mahidol Wit (Thai: มหิดลวิทย์), is a secondary school in Thailand. Situated on the Salaya Campus of Mahidol University in Nakhon Pathom Province, it enrolls Mathayom 4–6 (grades 10–12) students and is the first specialised science school in the country, designed to provide education for the development of gifted and talented students in science and mathematics. The school is unique among Thai schools in that it functions as an autonomous public organisation, and receives direct funding from the government of up to 100,000 baht per student, which means that all students are awarded a full scholarship for three years, including accommodation. Since its conception in 2000, the school has rapidly become one of the most prominent schools in Thailand, with intense competition for enrolment. 20,871 students sat the school's entrance examination in 2009, while the school enrolls 240 students annually.

History
Mahidol Wittayanusorn School was founded with the purpose of promoting science and mathematics education in the Thai school system, due to concerns regarding Thailand's lack of human resources specialised in science and technology. The school was established on 28 August 1990 with cooperation between Mahidol University, which was already recognised for its science studies and would provide academic support, and the Department of General Education of the Ministry of Education, which would be the school's governing authority.

The school opened on 3 June 1991. Initially, classes were temporarily held at Wat Rai Khing in Sam Phran District until the school finally settled at its current location on the Salaya Campus of Mahidol University in 1995. This initial arrangement, however, had many limitations, mostly due to the teaching system, which still depended on the national curriculum, and inflexibility due to organisation structure as a governmental agency, and the school saw relatively little growth during the first ten years.

In 1999, government policy pushed for the development of science-specific schools to accommodate students talented in science and mathematics. Mahidol Wittayanusorn School was accordingly remodeled as an autonomous public organisation under the supervision of the minister of education on 25 August 2000, and was designated the country's first specialised science school. The first principal of the school in this form was Dr. Thongchai Chewprecha, who was the director of the Institute for the Promotion of Teaching Science and Technology. The school then developed its own curriculum and teaching systems, and began admitting students under this new regime in the 2001 academic year. The number of students competing for admission increased from 8,501 in 2001 to 17,539 in 2006.

In the 2018 academic year, Mahidol Wittayanusorn School had the highest average score on the Ordinary National Education Test (O-NET) examination, calculated using an average of scores over 5 subjects.

Honors
Mahidol Wittayanusorn School, along with other well-known international science schools, has initiated an International Student Science Fair (called Thailand International Science Fair at the time of establishment) to provide venues for discussion and collaboration among students, as well as opportunities for students to present science projects they have conducted under close mentorship of faculty members from the schools and universities. In 2011, Mahidol Wittayanusorn School hosted the 7th International Student Science Fair. Among more than 30 schools that have participated in the event, those that have hosted the event are Ritsumeikan High School, Korea Science Academy, City Montessori School, National Junior College, and Australian Science and Mathematics School. Moreover, Mahidol Wittayanusorn School also provides bilateral student exchanges for its students and students from many countries across the globe including Singapore, Germany, Israel, and South Korea.

Students from Mahidol Wittayanusorn School also received awards from national and international competitions, such as the World Scholar's Cup, and various International Science Olympiads. The school also prepares students for their further education at world-class leading universities. In the past, alumni from the schools have succeeded in enrolling at top-ranked universities, including Stanford University, Massachusetts Institute of Technology, Columbia University, and Brown University. The school also has a bilateral agreement with KAIST, a top-ranked science and technology university in South Korea, where the school sends a handful of students to every year.

Campus and facilities
The school occupies four hectares in the northeastern section of Mahidol University's Salaya Campus. School facilities include the academic resource center, astronomy virtual reality theatre, science, language, electronics and computer laboratories, industrial drawing, mechanics and ceramics workshops, and a four-story sports center. The school also has a computer network system featuring 400 computer terminals, and the entire school campus is equipped with wireless network access.

Since the school focuses primarily on natural sciences, its laboratories possess sufficient equipment. The school library, officially called the academic resource center, stores books and provides computers for public use.

The sport center features four badminton courts, table-tennis, squash rooms, dance floor, a fitness center, a basketball pitch, and a swimming pool. The school also has another cement basketball pitch and a green standard football field, the periphery of which is a running track. The school also has a first aid room, a shop, colloquially called the minimart, and a canteen.

Curriculum
Mahidol Wittayanusorn School develops its own curriculum based on the requirements of the Thai National Curriculum and conducts revisions triennially.

As a boarding school, learning activities are extended to outside the classroom. Extracurricular activities, including one student science project under close mentorship and supervision of professors from universities, are specified as requirements for graduation. Other requirements focus on the academics, such as attending guest lectures, finishing certain readings, participating in educational trips and camps, and those focused on social aspects, such as volunteering for the school and neighborhood, exercising, and organizing camps for underserved children in rural and suburban areas.

Academics
Under the new school structure, Mahidol Wittayanusorn graduates have had a university entry rate of 100 percent. Mathayom 6 students averaged 376.91 points in the first O-NET examinations in the 2005 academic year, the country's highest. Additionally, a significant number of graduates (9.2 percent in the 2004 academic year) have been awarded scholarships to continue their education abroad.

Mahidol Wittayanusorn students have also gained international prominence in the International Science Olympiads. Many students are selected as national representatives after a long period of excellent academic performance evaluated by the Institute for the Promotion of Teaching Science and Technology, a national governmental organisation.

In 2005, the school hosted the first International Student Science Fair, in which youth from schools around the world in the then newly established International Science Schools Network came to present their science projects.

References

External links
 Official website, English version
 Alumni website

Schools in Nakhon Pathom Province
Educational institutions established in 1990
1990 establishments in Thailand
Public organizations of Thailand
Boarding schools in Thailand
Science education in Thailand